There are a handful of law enforcement establishments in the Maldives.

Police
Maldives Police Service

The organization is headed by Ministry of Home Affairs, commissioner of Police and Deputy commissioner. Service branches include;
 Commissioner’s Bureau
 Professional Standards Command
 Specialist Crime Command
 Central Operations Command
 Divisional Operations Command
 Directorate of Intelligence
 Forensic Service Directorate
 Service Development Directorate
 Service Support Directorate
 Information & Communication Directorate
 Institute for Security & Law Enforcement Studies

Armed Forces
Maldives National Defence Force (MNDF)

The organization is headed by Ministry of Defense and Chief of Defence Force Major General Abdulla Shamaal. Service branches include;
 Coast Guard
 Marine Corps
 Special Forces
 Service Corps
 Corps of Engineers
 Special Protection Group
 Military police
 Air Wing
 Defence Institute for Training and Education
 Medical Service
 Fire and Rescue Service

Customs 
Maldives Customs Service

Maldives Customs Service is a law enforcement organization established under the Maldives Customs Act (No: 8/2011). Though the Act came into force in 2011, history of Customs can be traced back to 1890, marking it as the oldest organization in the Maldives.

The Organization is headed by Ministry of Defense and Commissioner General of Customs.

Today Customs operation is carried out across the country, including international airports and seaports. There are 3 designated international seaports and 3 international airports, major ones established in the Central Region.

Customs vision is mainly focused on border enforcement and facilitating legitimate trade and travels while reflecting international standards and best practices.

Immigration
Maldives Immigration

The organization is headed by Ministry of Defense and Controller General of Immigration. Service branches include;
 Permit Section
 Travel Document Section
 Airport Control Section
 Harbour Control Section
 Expatriate Monitoring and Repatriation Division

Prison
Maldives Correctional Service

The organization is headed by Ministry of Home Affairs and Commissioner of Prisons. Service branches include;
 Maafusi Prison
 Asseyri Prison
 Male' Prison
 HulhuMale Detention Centre
 Emergency Support Group
 Prison Academy
 Parole Office
 Rehabilitation Command
 Operations Command
 Cooperate Command

External links
 Maldives Police Service
 National Integrity Commission
 Human Rights Commission of the Maldives
 National Social Protection Agency
 Family Protection Authority
 Ministry of Gender, Family and Social Services
 Employment Tribunal of Maldives
 Environmental Protection Agency
 Anti-Corruption Commission
 Judicial Service Commission
 Maldives National Defence Force
 Maldives Immigration
 Maldives Customs Service
 Maldives Correctional Service

 
Law of the Maldives